Club Náutico Hacoaj is an Argentine sports club headquartered in the Tigre district of Greater Buenos Aires. Although the institution was founded as a rowing club, Hacoaj hosts a wide range of activities, including basketball, field hockey, football, golf, softball, tennis, and volleyball, among others.

The club is considered one of the most important institutions of the Jewish community in Argentina, along with Club Maccabi.

History
Large numbers of Jews first came to Argentina in the middle of the 19th century. Those were the times when Argentina encouraged immigration from Europe. The first Jews arrived from Russia, Poland, The Austro-Hungarian Empire and Germany, while other Jewish people came from the Ottoman Empire. Those groups established their homes mainly in the rural areas of Buenos Aires, Entre Ríos and Santa Fe where they worked as tenant farmers.

During the decades of the 1920s and 1930s a second immigrant group arrived to Argentina, where they developed their professional careers in the biggest cities of the country, working as teachers, journalists, actors, and politicians. The districts where the most Jews established were Villa Crespo, Balvanera, Flores, Barracas, La Boca and suburban areas. As they usually did, Jewish people organized their social activities founding their own institutions such as temples, cemeteries, hospitals, committees and clubs.

Mauricio Schverlij, a young Jewish engineer, had asked to be admitted as a member of a rowing club of Tigre Partido, but his request was rejected. Suspecting that the rejection was due to his Jewish origin, Schverlij called his own relatives and friends with the purpose of creating a rowing club that represented the Jewish community. On the night of 24 December 1935, a meeting was held, establishing the "Club Náutico Israelita" ("Israelite Rowing Club", in Spanish). The word "Náutico" (Nautical) was to underline its rowing activities, as at that time it was the first club where Jews could practice that sport. One year later the club changed its name to "Club Náutico Hacoaj" in honor of its namesake, Hakoah (in Vienna, Austria), later destroyed by the Nazis in 1938 (coah/coaj/כּוֹחַ means power in Hebrew). Hacoaj started in a small rented place in Tigre, with a mooring, a few boats, tennis courts, basketball, bocce, football, a colonial-style main building, dormitories and a wooden dance floor.

Facilities
It currently has four locations:
 Sede Tigre "Roberto Maliar" (the original location, named after a longtime president of the club)
 Club de Campo (country club located near the "Sede Tigre")
 La isla (an island in the Paraná Delta that can be reached rowing from the Tigre Location)
 Sede Capital (a building in Buenos Aires, where social and sports activities are held during the week)

Club Sports 
 Athleticism
 Basketball
 Boating
 Bowls
 Field Hockey
 Football
 Golf
 Gymnastics
 Judo
 Netball
 Paddle
 Rowing
 Softball
 Tennis
 Volleyball

Notable members
 Daniel Brailovsky (football), who played for Argentina and Israel national teams
 Diego Schwartzman (tennis), reached 2017 and 2019 U.S. Open QF and 2018 QF and 2020 SF at Roland Garros.

References

External links

Official website

Hakoah sport clubs
Multi-sport clubs in Argentina
Rowing clubs in Argentina
Jewish organisations based in Argentina
Argentine volleyball teams
Golf clubs and courses in Argentina
Diaspora sports clubs in Argentina